Tetulia is a union parishad situated at the southwest part of Tala Upazila, in Satkhira District, Khulna Division of Bangladesh.

References

Unions of Tala Upazila
Unions of Satkhira District